Finally Free is the fourth album of Lebanese-Canadian artist Karl Wolf released on 10 July 2012 after Face Behind the Face (2006), Bite the Bullet (2007) and Nightlife (2009). Musically the album is rooted in electronic music, while branching off into other genres such as dance-pop, house music, dubstep, R&B, and hip hop.

Prior to the release of the album, two singles appearing on the album had already been released as singles in 2011, "Ghetto Love" featuring Kardinal Offishall and "Mash It Up" (produced by Greg Stainer and Dany Neville) featuring Three 6 Mafia, also released as "Fuck Shit Up" In addition to the title track "Finally Free", the track "DJ Gonna Save Us" written by Devion Young, Sean Alexander, and Karl Wolf featuring Mr. OxXx was the third single from the album.

Track list
All songs written by Karl Wolf except as indicated
"Finally Free" (3:18)
"UFO" (3:58) [Beat Merchant / Show Stevens / Karl Wolf]
"Ghetto Love" (feat. Kardinal Offishall) (3:24) [ Peter Cetera / David Foster / Diane Nini / Karl Wolf]
"Peace Out" (feat. P. Reign) (3:16) [Jeremy Thurber / Karl Wolf]
"Mash It Up" (feat. Three 6 Mafia) (4:06) [Ricky J. / Show Stevens / Karl Wolf]
"DJ Gonna Save Us" (feat. Mr. OxXx) (4:17) [ Sean Alexander / Karl Wolf / Devion Young]
"Number One" (feat. Demarco) (3:06) [ Karl Wolf / Fred Wreck]
"Crazy4U" (3:29) [John Stary]
"Never Let You Go" (3:33) [Cory Campbell / Anthony Leggett]
"Wake Up" (3:25) [ Ricky Campanelli / David Lopera / Jose David Lopera / Shahe Sinanoglu / Karl Wolf]
"Tell Me" (feat. Nirvana Savoury) (3:13) [Show Stevens / Karl Wolf]
"Belly Dancer" (3:25)
"No Way" (3:42)
"Connected" (feat. Robin) (3:17) [Beat Merchant / Karl Wolf
"DJ Gonna Save Us" (Dubstep Remix) (3:06) [Sean Alexander / Karl Wolf / Devion Young]
"Waiting for a Star to Fall" (Karl Wolf & Cassandra Debison) (bonus track available only on special edition version of the album) (4:39)

References

2012 albums
Karl Wolf albums